Ethiopia–Mexico relations are the diplomatic relations between the Federal Democratic Republic of Ethiopia and the United Mexican States. Both nations are members of the Group of 24 and the United Nations.

History 

Ethiopia was the only nation in Africa to have never been colonized by a European country. In 1935, Italian troops entered Ethiopia and successfully triumphed over the Ethiopian army and proceeded to occupy the country for the next five years. This was known as the Second Italo-Ethiopian War. At the League of Nations, Mexico was one of only five member-states to condemn the Italian invasion and occupation of Ethiopia. Because of this, Ethiopia kept its seat in the assembly, and it remained a member of the League. A few years after World War II, diplomatic relations between Ethiopia and Mexico were established in 1949. In 1954, Emperor Haile Selassie became the first ever head of state from an African nation to pay an official visit to Mexico.

In 1963, both nations opened embassies in each other's capitals, respectively; however, Mexico closed its embassy in Ethiopia in 1989 due to financial reasons and Ethiopia followed suit in 1990. In 2007, Mexico re-opened its embassy in Addis Ababa.

To commemorate Mexico's assistance to Ethiopia during its occupation by Italy; Ethiopia named a center square in Addis Ababa "Mexico Square". On the 22nd of June, 1954, a traffic circle in Mexico City was named "Plaza Etiopía", and in August 1980, a metro station in Mexico City was built and named Metro Etiopía Station. In 1985, after a major earthquake shook Mexico City, Ethiopia donated $5,000 to help aid the victims of the earthquake. In 2010, the Mexican government donated a replica of an Olmec colossal head to Ethiopia where it was placed in Mexico Square. In September 2015, the Ethiopian capital inaugurated its Light Rail system and has a "Mexico Station".

In May 2010, Mexican Minister of Foreign Affairs, Patricia Espinosa, visited Ethiopia with the purpose of promoting issues related to the Sixteenth UN Conference for Climate Change (COP16) as well as issues of bilateral and regional interest. In July 2010, Ethiopian Prime Minister Meles Zenawi arrived to Cancún to attend the United Nations Climate Change Conference. In June 2012, Prime Minister Zenawi again visited Mexico to participate in the G-20 summit in Los Cabos. In 2017, Ethiopian Airlines launched cargo services between both nations.

In 2019, both nations celebrated 70 years of diplomatic relations.

High-level visits

High-level visits from Ethiopia to Mexico
 Emperor Haile Selassie (1954)
 Foreign Minister Tekeda Alemu (2008)
 Prime Minister Meles Zenawi (2010, 2012)
 Foreign Minister Hailemariam Desalegn (2012)

High-level visits from Mexico to Ethiopia
 Foreign Minister Patricia Espinosa (2010)
 Director General for Africa and Middle East Sara Valdés (2012)
 Director General for Africa and the Middle East Jorge Álvarez Fuentes (2018)
 Foreign Undersecretary Julián Ventura (2019)

Bilateral agreements
Ethiopia and Mexico have signed the following bilateral agreements: Agreement to Establish Consultations on Mutual Interests (2006) and an Agreement on the Elimination of Visa Requirements for Diplomatic Passport Holders (2006).

Trade relations 
In 2018, two-way trade between Ethiopia and Mexico amounted to US$8.6 million. Ethiopia's main exports to Mexico include: sesame seeds and industrial equipment to make shoes. Mexico's main exports to Ethiopia include: landing gears, knives and electronic equipment. Between 1999 - 2011 Ethiopian direct investments in Mexico amounted to US$2.5 million. Ethiopia is Mexico's 141st biggest trading partner globally.

Resident diplomatic missions
 Ethiopia is accredited to Mexico from its embassy in Havana, Cuba and maintains an honorary consulate in Mexico City.
 Mexico has an embassy in Addis Ababa.

References 

Mexico
Bilateral relations of Mexico